Anthony Walker (born 19 November 1939) is an Australian rower. He competed in the men's coxless four event at the 1964 Summer Olympics.

References

1939 births
Living people
Australian male rowers
Olympic rowers of Australia
Rowers at the 1964 Summer Olympics
Place of birth missing (living people)
20th-century Australian people